Fists and Fodder is a 1920 American silent comedy film featuring Oliver Hardy.

Cast
 Jimmy Aubrey as A Tramp
 Dixie Lamont as A Settlement Worker
 Oliver Hardy as Her Father (as Babe Hardy)
 Leo White as A Rival

See also
 List of American films of 1920
 Oliver Hardy filmography

External links

1920 films
1920 short films
American silent short films
American black-and-white films
1920 comedy films
Films directed by Jess Robbins
Silent American comedy films
American comedy short films
1920s American films